Kit Carson is a surviving 1928 American silent Western film directed by Lloyd Ingraham and Alfred L. Werker and written by Frederic Hatton, Frances Marion and Paul Powell. The film stars Fred Thomson, Nora Lane, Dorothy King (credited as Dorothy Janis), Raoul Paoli, William Courtright and Nelson McDowell. The film was released on June 23, 1928, by Paramount Pictures. It is loosely inspired by the life of the frontiersman Kit Carson. A sound film biopic Kit Carson was released in 1940.

Cast 
 Fred Thomson as Kit Carson
 Nora Lane as Josefa
 Dorothy King as Sings-in-the-Clouds
 Raoul Paoli as Shuman
 William Courtright as Old Bill Williams
 Nelson McDowell as Jim Bridger
 Ray Turner as Smokey

Preservation status
 The film is preserved at the Cinemteket-Svenska Filminstitutet, Stockholm.

References

External links 
 
 lobby poster

1928 films
1920s English-language films
1928 Western (genre) films
Paramount Pictures films
Films directed by Lloyd Ingraham
Films directed by Alfred L. Werker
American black-and-white films
Films set in the 19th century
1920s historical films
American historical films
Silent American Western (genre) films
1920s American films